Fandango was a Mexican Girl pop group formed in 1984 until their disbanding in 1991 consisting of 5 teenage girls from Monterrey, Mexico. They taped and released their first music album under EMI music. Fandango was created from the late 1980s pop-music revolution throughout Mexico to compete against other teenager groups like Menudo, Timbiriche, Flans, and Pandora. In 1987 they charted with their smash hit "Autos, Moda y Rock and Roll" remaining in the Top 10 for over 2 months. The group set a dressing trend among teenagers in Mexico at the time. The track is featured on the Grand Theft Auto V soundtrack.

Origins and first years
Everything begins in 1984 when 5 teenage girls who belonged to the names of: Yadira, Rocio, Diana Carolina, Moña and Evalinda, childhood friends decide to unite to create a new youth group under the baton of young producer Abelardo Leal, which gets associated a label (Zigan Records) Monterrey and with this group in 1985 recorded his first LP titled Contrastes, which was only distributed in the city of Monterrey and among family and friends of the girls, while the group only presented in private parties and malls.

A couple of months after the album release Yadira & Diana Carolina left the group, this action cost them total anonymity, as in the various biographies of the group have never been mentioned as part of Fandango.

Finish the year before joining the project two girls: Liliana & Alexa, which together with Evalinda, Moña and Rocio form what for many is the original alignment.

Starting 1986, the girls presented with the opportunity to step out of anonymity because the Luis Moyano artistic director of EMI Capitol achieved interested in them, thus starting a lucrative recording contract.
That same year his first LP reissued Fandango entitled Contrastes again made an album with a very low budget that failed to interest anyone.

Success 
It is not until the year 1987 that Fandango is no longer a living movement and three times danced with castanets, but it becomes the name of a band whose songs and choreography are stored to be part of the youth festivals. They are formally presented in June in the city of Querétaro for the Pageant "Miss Mexico", from there its themes Autos, Moda & Rock and Roll, La Vuelta a mi Corazón en 80 Segundos, Irresistible Seduccion and Un Millón de Maneras de Olvidarte, take over the radio dial, as well as their second LP entitled Autos, Moda & Rock and Roll, in which Alexa, Rocio, Liliana, Moña and Evalinda become role models for girls and young women in Mexico. Due to the success with which he entered the music market, this year are invited to receive the award program's 15 major Siempre en Domingo led by Raul Velasco. They are then recognized with a gold record for the highest album sales, considered the most successful group.

By December of that year are invited to a Christmas album with artists such as Yuri, Flans, Timbiriche, Mijares came another called This Christmas Carol where they interpret "Dime Niño de quien eres".

Popularity and the lineup changes 
In 1988, releases his third LP titled ¡Hola! Que Tal, album with the five girls who manage to maintain their popularity. During this time the group recorded special topics such as "Para ti, Para mi" and the theme "La Brujita Boba" which was included in a children's album "Había una Vez" released by his record label and had the participation of the most important artists of the label as Pandora, Yuri, Manuel Mijares and Tatiana.

During the promotion of ¡Hola! Que Tal, Alexa left the group for matters of a personal nature (years later joined the group Timbiriche). What was left of promoting the album went on alone with the 4 remaining members. Shortly thereafter, Evalinda also left the group to live a normal life, then it was discovered that her mother out of the group. After this drop EMI choose for their replacements to Sandra & Janett.

Lack of support from EMI 
To welcome their new members, the group released in 1989 Fandango his fourth Lp (Also known as Sueños Mágicos), where the songs "Sueños Mágicos", "Dos Corazones en la Oscuridad" and "Todos Quieren Bailar Conmigo" are successful in radio dial, something completely identified with the young people who grew up with the urge to dance, besides being an innovative album with a strong European influence that gave a touch of art. A mid-year the group has a special participation in the famous TV show: Papa Soltero.

In the fourth Lp full promotion, EMI was increasingly losing interest in the group to conclude that it would not renew his contract due to "lack of renown", an issue that was certainly true. Because of this the five girls and Abelardo concluded that EMI did not put the same amount of promotion and advertising in the group, looked at Fandango as if it was dissolved.

Ronald Correa
In this difficult situation a businessman named Ronald Correa met Abelardo Leal and convinced the girls to continue without EMI. Two of the original members Liliana and Moña left the band. Liliana left to pursue a career in show business and Moña married Abelardo Leal. Two new girls, Anabella and Marlene were selected as replacements.

The group continued to perform without a record label at outdoor concerts in Los Angeles, California, USA.

Internationalization and a return to EMI
In December 1990, Fandango was unexpectedly included in an interview for "TEEN" a youth magazine which was launched in the United States, something that no other Mexican artist had done. This again captured the attention of EMI and Sony Music both of which had offers targeted towards the group giving them a choice between the two music labels.

Fandango decided to record another album with EMI and Volver a Ser Feliz their fifth LP was released within a few weeks of December 1990 with the same compositions Hernaldo Hays-Seeger-Zúñiga, Manuel Pacho, Emilio Gonzalez, Abelardo Leal, among others. Just with this new album saw the group Ronald brought more current trends, but as EMI did not see the new image of the group to bring money and sales stopped promoting the album.

Resistance to dissolution 
At this point, the girls decided Fandango frustrated end. Rocio after a while married like Janett, Anabella returned to Mexico City, Marlene continued her studies and is currently host of a children's program in her native Monterrey, where she calls herself "Lore-Lore", while Sandra lives a normal life.

Desperate to avoid the end of Fandango, Correa was able to convince the Target department store to have as a spokesperson for Fandango store openings, near the US-Mexico border. However, Anabella, Marlene, Sandra and Rocio refused to be part of the promotion, ending their cycle in the group. Correa was able to convince only Janett and the original member Liliana (who had left the group in 1990) to participate in this adventure, but would have to get three more girls to make a new Fandango. They integrate Jeannie, Janett's younger sister and two of her friends from school.

The group filmed two commercials for the store that were transmitted through the holiday season of 1991. After the recording of the trade, Abelardo Leal decided that Fandango was completed and ended his alliance with Correa. As a result, Fandango ceased to exist.

During mid-2000s, with the revolution of the 1980s back in fashion including music, EMI reissued 3 of the 5 discs Fandango Compact Disc format and digital format achieving high online sales.

Members

Original members:

 Alexa Lozano (1985 to 1988) - who then became a member of Timbiriche
 Evalinda Gonzales (1984 to 1988)
 Liliana García González (1985 to 1990)
 Maria Eugenia Arrambide Cantu "Moña" (1984 to 1990)
 Rocio Torres Segovia (1984 to 1991) - the only member to stay in the group throughout its entire existence

Replacement members:

 Sandra Elizondo Guerra from 1988 to 1991 (she replaced Alexa)
 Janett Tamez Martinez from 1988 to 1991 (she replaced Evalinda)
 Anabella De Hoyos from 1990 to 1991(she replaced Liliana)
 Marlene Lorena Cortinas from 1990 - 1991(she replaced Moña)

 Unknown members

 Diana Carolina (1984)
 Yadira Durán  (1984)
 Jeannie Tamez Martinez and two friends (commercials for the store 1991)

Music albums

 1986 - Contrastes
 1987 - Autos, Moda y Rock and Roll, EMI
 1988 - ¡Hola! Qué Tal, EMI
 1989 - Fandango / Sueños Magicos (Magical Dreams)
 1990 - Volver A Ser Feliz

Singles
 1987 - Autos, Moda y Rock and Roll, From Self Titled Debut Album
 1987 - Un Millón de Maneras de Olvidarte, From Autos, Moda y Rock and Roll album
 1988 - ¡Hola! Que Tal, From Self Titled Album
 1989 - Sueños Mágicos, From Fandango (also known as "Sueños Magicos" (Magical Dreams)
 1989 - Todos Quieren Bailar Conmigo, From Fandango (also known as "Sueños Magicos" (Magical Dreams)
 1989 - Dos Corazones en la Oscuridad, From Fandango (also known as "Sueños Magicos" (Magical Dreams)
 1990 - Dame Aquel Martillo, From Volver  a Ser Feliz album
 1991 - Es Tu Voz, From Volver  a Ser Feliz album

Compilations
 1991 - 16 Super Exitos, EMI
 1997 - Mis Momentos, EMI

Mexican pop music groups
Mexican girl groups
Musical groups established in 1986
Musical groups disestablished in 1991
1986 establishments in Mexico